John Brenden "Jack" Kelly Jr. (May 24, 1927 – March 2, 1985), also known as Kell Kelly, was an American athlete, an accomplished rower, a four-time Olympian, and an Olympic medal winner. He was the son of triple Olympic gold medal winner Jack Kelly Sr., and the elder brother of the actress and Princess of Monaco, Grace Kelly. In 1947, Kelly was awarded the James E. Sullivan Award as the top amateur athlete in the United States. He served a brief tenure as president of the United States Olympic Committee.

Kelly was also a politician, and served as an at-large member of the Philadelphia City Council.

Early life and family

Kelly was born in Philadelphia, Pennsylvania, the second child and only son of Margaret Katherine Majer and John Kelly Sr.. His paternal grandparents were Irish immigrants, with his grandfather from County Mayo, Ireland. John Sr. was the son of a farmer; he started his own bricklaying business, "Kelly for Brickwork", and became a multimillionaire. His mother's parents were German and emigrated to the United States. Before her marriage, his mother Margaret was a model and competitive swimmer. She converted from Protestantism to Roman Catholicism when she married. Kelly's uncle George Kelly was a Pulitzer Prize-winning playwright.

Kelly had an older sister Margaret (born September 1925 and nicknamed "Peggy") and two younger sisters, Grace (born November 1929) and Elizabeth Anne (born June 1933 and nicknamed "Lizanne"). Kelly's younger sister Grace would go on to become an Academy Award winning film actor and marry Rainier III, Prince of Monaco in 1956. Kelly's nephew is Monaco's current monarch Prince Albert II. The children were raised in a 17-room house on 3901 Henry Avenue in East Falls, Philadelphia

Kelly served in the United States Navy during World War II. He was stationed in United States Naval Training Center Bainbridge. Kelly graduated from the University of Pennsylvania in 1950 and rowed for the varsity team.

Sports and rowing

Kelly represented the United States at the 1948 Summer Olympics at London, United Kingdom, the 1952 Summer Olympics in Helsinki, Finland and the 1956 Summer Olympics in Melbourne, Australia in rowing in the single scull (1x). He represented the United States in the double scull (2x) at the 1960 Summer Olympics in Rome. Kelly won a bronze medal at the 1956 Games. He also won gold medals at the 1955 and 1959 Pan American Games and 1949 European Championships.

Kelly at Henley

Kelly's father John B. Kelly Sr. won two gold medals at the 1920 Summer Olympics, capturing both the single scull (1x) and the double scull (2x). The senior Kelly repeated his victory in the double scull at the 1924 Summer Olympics.  In 1920, despite his accomplishments as an rower, the senior Kelly's entry was rejected at the then most prestigious rowing event in the world, the Henley Royal Regatta.  According to the minutes of the regatta's Committee of Management, Kelly was excluded for two reasons: first, because having worked as a bricklayer he was not eligible under the regatta's then rules on amateurism (which excluded anyone "...who is or ever has been … by trade or employment for wages a mechanic, artisan or labourer") and second because he was a member of Vesper Boat Club which was banned in 1906 after members of their 1905 crew raised money through a public subscription to pay for their travel expenses. Kelly's exclusion was widely reported in newspapers in both the UK and US, with many seeing it as an attempt to prevent an American from winning the prestigious Diamond Challenge Sculls event  although an American, Edward Ten Eyck, had previously won the event in 1897.

In 1947, Kelly Jr. won the Diamond Challenge Sculls (single scull) at the Henley, the event from which his father had been excluded. In recognition of his accomplishment, Kelly was awarded the 1947 James E. Sullivan Award as the top amateur athlete in the United States. In 1949 Kelly repeated his feat and again won the Diamond Challenge Sculls at Henley. In 1980, Kelly's sister Princess Grace of Monaco was invited to present the trophies at the Regatta. In 2003, the Princess Grace Challenge Cup named in her honour was first presented. In 2004, Grace's son (and Kelly's nephew) Prince Albert of Monaco presented the trophies at the Regatta.

Kelly at the Olympics

At the 1948 Summer Olympics in London, Kelly competed on the same Henley course where he had won the Diamond Challenge Sculls the year before.  Kelly won his opening heat, but did not make the finals after finishing second to eventual Silver Medalist Eduardo Risso in the semi-finals.  (Due to course width constrictions, the Henley course could only handle a 3 boat final).

At the 1952 Summer Olympics in Helsinki, Kelly again won his opening heat.  In the semi-final, which was one to qualify, Kelly finished second to eventual champion Yuriy Tyukalov, and Kelly was relegated to the repechage, or second-chance race, which was also one to qualify for the final.  In the repechage, Kelly's main competitor was Teodor Kocerka of Poland.  They fought all the way down the course with Kocerka, who would go on to win the Bronze medal, prevailing in a close finish.

At the 1956 Summer Olympics in Melbourne, Kelly won his Olympic medal, a bronze. He was beaten by two teenage prodigies, Vyacheslav Ivanov of Russia and Stuart Mackenzie of Australia, but Kelly beat Teodor Kocerka, who had beaten Kelly four years earlier. Kelly gave the medal to his sister Grace, who married Prince Rainier earlier that year, as a wedding present.  He would later quip that he had hoped it would have been a different color.

In 1960, Kelly competed in the double scull at his final Olympics in Rome.  His boat would be eliminated in the repechage.

Later career in sports
In 1964, following his retirement from rowing, Kelly acted as manager for the United States Olympic 8-man boat.  It was composed of rowers from the Vesper Boat Club, to which Kelly also belonged.  That boat won a Gold Medal at the 1964 Summer Olympics in Tokyo.  In 1968, Kelly served as a member of the national committee for the modern pentathlon.

Kelly became a passionate advocate for athletes. He was elected president of the Amateur Athletic Union in 1970 and stirred controversy by arguing that the amateur code had become outmoded, thereby helping free the Olympics from sham amateurism.

In 1974, Kelly headed a group of Philadelphia business men who became owners of the Philadelphia Bell, a franchise in the now defunct World Football League. Kelly's name and connections were important in giving the franchise legitimacy and in negotiating agreements with the city of Philadelphia.  However, as the first season progressed, Kelly stepped aside as the team president in favor of John Bosacco, who owned a controlling interest in the franchise.

In February 1985, Kelly was elected president of the United States Olympic Committee. The appointment was short-lived – Kelly died three weeks later. Kelly was posthumously inducted into the United States Olympic Hall of Fame as a contributor. Kelly and his father are the only parent-child duo in the Olympic Hall of Fame.

Business and professional life
Kelly was a respected businessperson as owner of "Kelly for Brickwork", a company started by his father, John B. Kelly Sr. Kelly was actively involved in politics and served for 12 years as City Councilman-At-Large in Philadelphia (D). Kelly also served on the Fairmount Park Commission.

For many years, Kelly played the role of George Washington in the annual Christmas Day re-enactment of the famous 1776 crossing of the Delaware River. The re-enactors would cross over from Pennsylvania to New Jersey on Christmas afternoon.

Personal life
Kelly's first wife was Mary Gray Freeman (now known as Mary Spitzer). She was the daughter of Monroe Edward and Christine Gray, the 1951 national women's champion in swimming and a member of the United States swimming team for the 1952 Olympics at Helsinki (she appeared on the cover of Life on July 23, 1951). They married in 1954 and had six children, including John B. Kelly III, Susan von Medicus, and Elizabeth "Liz" Kelly.  Kelly and Freeman divorced in 1980.

In 1975, Kelly's well-publicized fling with a transwoman named Rachel Harlow was a factor in his decision to drop out of the mayoral contest in Philadelphia when the opposition threatened to campaign with the slogan "Do you want Rachel Harlow as First Lady of Philadelphia?

On May 28, 1982, Kelly married Sandra Lee Worley, a banker. She was the daughter of Laura Kristine Worley and Chief Warrant Officer Russell Edwin. They remained married until Kelly's death in 1985.

Kelly served as Philadelphia City Councilman-at-Large from 1967 to 1979

Death
On the morning of March 2, 1985, Kelly suffered a fatal heart attack while jogging to The Athletic Club in Philadelphia after his customary morning row on the Schuylkill River. His body was discovered on 18th and Callowhill Street shortly after 9:30 am. Kelly was taken to Hahnemann University Hospital where he was pronounced dead.

Jack Kelly Jr.'s private funeral was held in Philadelphia. Among the attendees were his brother-in-law Rainier III, Prince of Monaco, his nieces Princess Caroline and Princess Stéphanie, his nephew the-then Prince Albert, then Philadelphia mayor Wilson Goode and former Philadelphia mayors William J. Green, III and Frank Rizzo. John Kelly Jr. is buried in Holy Sepulchre Cemetery in Cheltenham Township, Pennsylvania.

Achievements and awards
 Diamond Scull, Henley Royal Regatta, 1947 and 1949
 James E. Sullivan Award Winner 1947
 Member US Olympic team 1948, 1952, 1956 and 1960
 Olympic Bronze Medallist in Single Scull, 1956
 8-time United States National Champion, single scull
 Member US rowing Hall of Fame, elected 1956
 Manager for the 1964 Olympic Gold Medal eight man boat
 President of the United States Olympic Committee.
 United States Olympic Hall of Fame, as a contributor
 Olympic Order in Silver
 City Councilman (Democrat-Philadelphia)

Legacy
 Kelly Drive, Philadelphia, formerly East River Drive, was renamed in his honor after his death. Boathouse Row is located here.

References

External links

 Schuylkill Navy site on Kelly, et al.

1927 births
1985 deaths
20th-century American businesspeople
American athlete-politicians
American people of German descent
American people of Irish descent
American sports executives and administrators
Burials at Holy Sepulchre Cemetery
James E. Sullivan Award recipients
Kelly family
American male rowers
Olympic bronze medalists for the United States in rowing
Pennsylvania Democrats
Philadelphia City Council members
Military personnel from Philadelphia
Rowers at the 1948 Summer Olympics
Rowers at the 1952 Summer Olympics
Rowers at the 1956 Summer Olympics
Rowers at the 1960 Summer Olympics
William Penn Charter School alumni
Medalists at the 1956 Summer Olympics
Pan American Games medalists in rowing
Pan American Games gold medalists for the United States
Catholics from Pennsylvania
Rowers at the 1955 Pan American Games
Rowers at the 1959 Pan American Games
Presidents of the United States Olympic Committee
European Rowing Championships medalists
Medalists at the 1955 Pan American Games
Medalists at the 1959 Pan American Games
United States Navy personnel of World War II